Forever is the seventeenth studio album by the funk band Kool & the Gang, released in 1986. The album included two major hits on the US Hot 100 Chart: "Victory" (US #10, R&B #2) and "Stone Love" (US #10, R&B #4).  Three additional singles charted, "Holiday" reached the top ten on the R&B Chart, "Special Way" reached #6 on the Adult Contemporary chart. and "Peacemaker" was released in international markets and charted at #20 in New Zealand.

After this album, lead vocalist James "J.T." Taylor would leave the group for a solo career.  He would return in 1996 for the State of Affairs album.

Track listing

Personnel
Bass – Robert "Kool" Bell
Drums – George Brown
Guitar – Charles Smith
Saxophone, keyboards – Khalis Bayyan
Keyboards – Curtis "Fitz" Williams
Vocals, percussion – James "J.T." Taylor
Alto saxophone – Dennis "Dee Tee" Thomas
Trombone – Clifford Adams
Trumpet – Michael Ray, Robert "Spike" Mickens
Additional musicians – Alex Williams, Kendal Stubbs, Mark Attalla
Backing vocals – Barbara Hernandez, Bert Clardy, Jeff Clardy, Kendal Stubbs, Lisa Foster, Starleana Young
Drum programming – Kendal Stubbs
Synthesizer and creative software programmed by – Randy Weber

Production
Recorded by – Alex Williams, I.B.M.C. Group Processing, Jay Biolic, Kendal Stubbs, Khalis Bayyan, Peter Ibrahim Duarte, Randy Weber
Engineer – Kendal Stubbs
Assistant engineers – Peter Ibrahim Duarte, Roger Talkov
Second engineer - Hit Factory – Craig Vogel
Mixed by – Kendal Stubbs, Khalis Bayyan
Mastered by – Herb "Pump" Powers, Jr.
Producer – I.B.M.C. Group Processing, Khalis Bayyan, Kool & the Gang
Executive producer – Gabe Vigorito

Art
Art direction – Bill Levy
Art design – George Corsillo
Cover photography – Gil Gilbert
Fashions by – Carl Davis for Lemans Designs
Make up – Rosalyn Burns-Brock

Certifications

References

Kool & the Gang albums
1986 albums
Mercury Records albums